The Paraíso Ecological Station was an ecological station in the state of Rio de Janeiro, Brazil. In 2013, it was absorbed into the Três Picos State Park.

Location

The Paraíso Ecological Station (ESEC) was divided between the municipalities of Cachoeiras de Macacu (76.2%) and Guapimirim (23.8%).
The area was considered representative of the Brazilian Atlantic Forest ecosystem.
It contained examples of submontane and montane forest.

History

The Paraíso Ecological Station was created by state decree 9.803 of 12 March 1987.
The objective was to conduct basic and applied research of the ecology, to protect the natural environment and to develop environmental education. 
It was expected that 90% of the area would be designated to permanent full preservation of the biota.
In 1979, FEEMA, which was responsible for the ESEC, implemented the Primatology Center of Rio de Janeiro (CPRJ) to study Brazilian primates, breed them in captivity and reintroduce them in the wild, covering .

The Paraíso Ecological Station was made part of the Central Rio de Janeiro Atlantic Forest Mosaic, created in 2006.
As of September 2010, the primatology center held about 250 captive small and medium sized primates in 85 nurseries, and was researching 16 species whose survival was compromised with a view to reintroducing them into their original environments.

On 31 October 2013 state law 6.573 extinguished the Paraíso Ecological Station and the Jacarandá State Environmental Protection Area, and modified the Bacia dos Frades Environmental Protection Area and the Três Picos State Park.
The Paraíso Ecological Station was integrated into the state park.
The primatology center continued operation in its original area.

Notes

Sources

 

Ecological stations of Brazil
Protected areas of Rio de Janeiro (state)
Protected areas established in 1987
1987 establishments in Brazil
2013 disestablishments in Brazil
Protected areas of the Atlantic Forest